164P/Christensen is a periodic comet in the Solar System.

References

External links 
 Orbital simulation from JPL (Java) / Horizons Ephemeris
 164P/Christensen – Seiichi Yoshida @ aerith.net
 Elements and Ephemeris for 164P/Christensen – Minor Planet Center

Periodic comets
0164
164P
20041221